When Mom Is Away... With the Family is a 2020 Italian Christmas comedy film directed by Alessandro Genovesi.

The film is a sequel to 2019 film When Mom Is Away.

Cast

Release
Originally set to be theatrically released on 16 December 2020, the film premiered on 4 December 2020 on Amazon Prime Video due to the second outbreak of the COVID-19 pandemic in Italy.

See also
 List of Christmas films
 Santa Claus in film

References

External links
 

2020s Christmas comedy films
2020s Italian-language films
Italian Christmas comedy films
Films directed by Alessandro Genovesi
Films not released in theaters due to the COVID-19 pandemic
Santa Claus in film
2010s Italian films